

A
Lou Abbruzzi,
Art Albrecht,
Bill Anderson

B
John Badaczewski,
Fritz Barzilauskas,
Stan Batinski

C
George Cafego,
Ralph Calcagni,
Rocco Canale,
Bill Chipley,
Bill Collins,
Vince Commisa,
Milt Crain,
Hal Crisler,
Joe Crowley,
Don Currivan

D
Boley Dancewicz,
Bob Davis,
Tom Dean,
Don Deeks,
Al Dekdebrun,
Babe Dimancheff,
George Doherty,
Joe Domnanovich,
Walt Dubzinski,
Paul Duhart

E
Don Eliason

F
Tony Falkenstein,
Gary Famiglietti,
Al Fiorentino,
Ed Fiorentino,
Ed Franco,
John Furey,

G
Wimpy Giddens,
Jim Gillette,
Bill Godwin,
Joe Golding,
Sam Goldman,
Paul Governali,
Frank Gaziano,
John Grigas,
Scott Gudmundson

H
Dick Harrison,
Robert Hazelhurst,
Ralph Heywood,
Joe Hoague

J
Mike Jarmoluk,
Ellis Jones,
Rubin Juster

K
Abe Karnofsky,
Bill Kennedy,
Ed Korisky,
Andy Kowalski

L
Gene Lee,
Tony Leon,
Augie Lio,
Bob Long

M
Jim Magee,
Howard Maley,
Gene Malinowski,
Vaughn Mancha,
Pug Manders,
Lou Mark,
Frank Martin,
Johnny Martin,
Bob Masterson,
Ned Mathews,
Frank Maznicki,
Bob McClure,
Hugh McCullough,
Ed McGee,
Bob McRoberts,
Jim Mello,
Mike Micka,
John Morelli,
Frank Muehlheuser

N
Frank Nelson,
John Nolan

P
Ace Parker,
Bill Paschal,
Win Pedersen,
John Poto,
Steve Pritko

R
Keith Ranspot,
Freeman Rexer,
Floyd Rhea,
Thron Riggs,
Tom Rodgers,
George Roman,
Rudy Romboli,
Dave Ryan

S
Joe Sabasteanski,
Frank Sachse,
Jack Sachse,
Paul Sanders,
Frank Santora,
Nick Scollard,
George Sergienko,
Frank Seno,
Steve Sierocinski,
Alex Sidorik,
Phil Slosburg,
George Smith,
Dave Smukler,
Leo Stasica,
Ken Steinmetz
Steve Sucic,
Joe Sulaitis,
George Sullivan

T
Morgan Tiller,
Frank Turbert,
Jim Tyree

V
Carroll Vogelaar

W
Bill Walker,
Joe Watt,
Ted Williams,
Gordon Wilson,
Walt Williams,
Jim Wright,
Harry Wynne

Y
Jim Youel

Z
Joe Zeno,
Roy Zimmerman,
Frank Zachman

References

profootballreference|accessdate=2009-06-01

 
Boston Y